Two Days of Miracles is a 1970 Soviet fantasy comedy film directed by Lev Mirsky based on the play Simply Awful! by Yuri Sotnik.

Plot
Young undereducated fairies Daisy and Violet from the Institute of Good Wizards after an unsuccessful exam go among people to get real-life practice and perform a "good miracle". After materializing on a boat, the fairies overhear the conversation of the head of the therapeutic department of the polyclinic Vadim Leonidovich, his wife and their son, who are returning from vacation. The fairies offer to change their places, and turn the mother into a girl. Vadim Leonidovich does not take the offer seriously and jokingly agrees. The fairies, rejoicing at the opportunity to perform a "good miracle", cast a spell and turn the father into a son, the son into father, and mother ... into a cactus.

At the same time, two other female sorceresses from the Institute of minor mischief also appear among people to commit more trouble.

Since the next day is the 1st of September, the son needs to go to school, and the father to work in the clinic, they try to teach and prepare each other for unexpectedly new habits and responsibilities in their childhood and adulthood.
And the fairies Daisy and Violet somehow manage to correct their mistake - they turn the mother-cactus into a mother-girl.

Cast
Leonid Kuravlyov - Vadim Murashev
Borya Mayhrovsky - Grisha Murashev
Mikhail Kozakov - professor-examiner of the Institute of Good Wizards
Elena Mozgovaya - fairy Violet
Natalia Markina - fairy Daisy
Erast Garin - professor-examiner at the Koshchei Immortal
Olga Aroseva - witch student Alfa Ivanovna Kokoshkina
Tamara Chernova - witch student Marfa Petrovna
Lidia Belinskaya (Lydia Petrovna, Grisha's mother)
Yuri Kritenko - Alexander Yefimovich Tukachev, head physician
Alexander Nazarov - Rostislav Mikhailovich, a psychiatrist
Lyudmila Stoyanova - young specialist Julia Ivanovna
Elena Malikova - Lida, mother-girl
Mariika Lokshina - Lilya
Slava Glushkov - Petya
Yasha Ovchukov - Artyom

See also
Simply Awful!, 1982 adaptation of the same play.

References

External links

Soviet fantasy comedy films
1970 comedy films
1970 films
Russian children's fantasy films
Gorky Film Studio films
1970s children's fantasy films
Films about wish fulfillment
1970s fantasy comedy films
Soviet children's films